Khalid Sheikh Mohammed (sometimes also spelled Shaikh; also known by at least 50 pseudonyms; born March 1, 1964, or April 14, 1965) is a Pakistani Islamist militant held by the United States at the Guantanamo Bay detention camp under terrorism-related charges. He was named as "the principal architect of the 9/11 attacks" in the 9/11 Commission Report. He is often referred to by his initials, KSM.

Sheikh Mohammed was a member of Osama bin Laden's al-Qaeda organization, leading al-Qaeda's propaganda operations from around 1999 until late 2001. Mohammed was captured on March 1, 2003, in the Pakistani city of Rawalpindi by a combined operation of the U.S. Central Intelligence Agency (CIA) and Pakistan's Inter-Services Intelligence (ISI). Immediately after his capture, Mohammad was extraordinarily rendered to secret CIA prison sites in Afghanistan, then Poland, where he was interrogated by U.S. operatives. By December 2006, he had been transferred to military custody at Guantanamo Bay detention camp.

In March 2007, after significant interrogations, Mohammed confessed to masterminding the September 11 attacks; the Richard Reid shoe bombing attempt to blow up an airliner; the Bali nightclub bombing in Indonesia; the 1993 World Trade Center bombing; the murder of Daniel Pearl; and various foiled attacks as well as numerous other crimes. He was charged in February 2008 with war crimes and murder by a U.S. military commission at Guantanamo Bay detention camp, which could carry the death penalty if convicted. In 2012, a former military prosecutor criticized the proceedings as insupportable due to confessions gained under torture. A 2008 decision by the United States Supreme Court had also drawn into question the legality of the methods used to gain such admissions and the admissibility of such admissions as evidence in a criminal proceeding.

On August 30, 2019, a military judge set a trial date of January 11, 2021, for Mohammed's death penalty trial. His trial was further postponed on December 18, 2020, due to the COVID-19 pandemic. Mohammed's trial restarted on September 7, 2021. However, as of 2023 his trial has been postponed again, further into 2023, as the Biden administration weighs a plea deal that would take the death penalty off the table.

Early life and education
According to official records, Mohammed was born on April 14, 1965, or March 1, 1964, in Balochistan, Pakistan or Kuwait. His father was Sheikh Mohammed Ali Doustin Baluchi, a lay Deobandi preacher, who moved the family to Kuwait from Balochistan in the 1960s. His mother was Halema Mohammed. Mohammed is the uncle of Ramzi Yousef, who was convicted on terrorism charges for his part in the 1993 World Trade Center bombing, and Ammar Al Baluchi, who is accused of involvement in multiple terror plots.

Mohammed is fluent in Balochi, Urdu, Arabic, and English.

According to U.S. federal documents, in 1982 he had heard Abdul Rasul Sayyaf's speech in which a call for jihad against the Soviets was declared. At age 16, he joined the Muslim Brotherhood. After graduating from high school in 1983, Mohammad travelled to the United States and enrolled in Chowan University in Murfreesboro, North Carolina. He later transferred to North Carolina Agricultural and Technical State University and received a Bachelor of Science (BS) in mechanical engineering in 1986.

The following year, he went to Peshawar, Pakistan, where he and his brothers, including Zahed, joined the mujahideen forces engaged in the Soviet–Afghan War. He attended the Sada training camp run by Sheikh Abdallah Azzam, and after that he worked for the magazine al-Bunyan al-Marsous, produced by Sayyaf's rebel group, the Islamic Union for the Liberation of Afghanistan. In 1992, he received a master's degree in Islamic Culture and History through correspondence classes from Punjab University in Pakistan. By 1993, Mohammad had married and moved his family to Qatar, where he took a position as project engineer with the Qatari Ministry of Electricity and Water. He began to travel to different countries from that time onward.

The United States 9/11 Commission Report notes that, "By his own account, KSM's animus toward the United States stemmed not from his experiences there as a student, but rather from his violent disagreement with U.S. foreign policy favoring Israel." However, on August 29, 2009, The Washington Post reported from U.S. intelligence sources that Mohammed's time in the U.S. contributed to his radicalization.

"KSM's limited and negative experience in the United States—which included a brief jail stay because of unpaid bills—almost certainly helped propel him on his path to becoming a terrorist," according to this intelligence summary. "He stated that his contact with Americans, while minimal, confirmed his view that the United States was a debauched and racist country."

Philippines 1994–1995
Mohammed was in the Philippines in late 1994 and early 1995; he then identified as a Saudi or a Qatari plywood exporter and used the aliases "Abdul Majid" and "Salem Ali."

Qatar, avoiding arrest
In early 1996, Mohammed returned to Afghanistan to avoid capture by U.S. authorities. In his flight from Qatar, he was sheltered by Sheikh Abdullah Al Thani, who was the Qatari Minister of Religious Affairs in 1996.

Alleged terrorist activities

Operation Bojinka

Mohammed traveled to the Philippines in 1994 to work with his nephew Ramzi Yousef on the Bojinka plot, a Manila-based plot to destroy 12 commercial airliners flying routes between the United States, East Asia, and Southeast Asia. The 9/11 Commission Report says that "this marked the first time KSM took part in the actual planning of a terrorist operation."

Bojinka plans included renting or buying a Cessna, packing it with explosives and crash landing it into CIA headquarters, with a backup plan to hijack the twelfth airliner in the air and use that instead. This information was reported in detail to the U.S. at the time.

In December 1994, Yousef had engaged in a test of a bomb on Philippine Airlines Flight 434 using only about ten percent of the explosives that were to be used in each of the bombs to be planted on U.S. airliners. The test resulted in the death of a Japanese national on board a flight from the Philippines to Japan. Mohammed conspired with Yousef in the plot until it was uncovered on January 6, 1995. Yousef was captured February 7 of that same year.

Khalid Sheikh Mohammed was indicted on terrorism charges in the United States District Court for the Southern District of New York in January 1996 for his alleged involvement in Operation Bojinka, and was subsequently placed on the October 10, 2001, initial list of the FBI's 22 Most Wanted Terrorists.

Relationship with Osama bin Laden
By the time the Bojinka plot was discovered, Mohammed had returned to Qatar and his job as a project engineer at the country's Ministry of Electricity and Water. He traveled in 1995 to Sudan, Yemen, Malaysia, and Brazil to visit elements of the worldwide jihadist community, although no evidence connects him to specific terrorist actions in any of those locations. On his trip to Sudan, he attempted to meet with Osama bin Laden, who was at the time living there, aided by Sudanese political leader Hassan al-Turabi. After the U.S. asked the Qatari government to arrest Mohammed in January 1996, he fled to Afghanistan, where he renewed his alliance with Abdul Rasul Sayyaf. Later that year, he formed a working relationship with Bin Laden, who had settled there.

Bin Laden and his colleagues relocated their operations to Afghanistan at this time. Mohammed Atef, bin Laden's chief of operations and also known at the time as Abu Hafs al-Masri, arranged a meeting between bin Laden and Mohammed in Tora Bora sometime in mid-1996, in which Mohammed outlined a plan that would eventually become the quadruple hijackings in 2001. Bin Laden urged Mohammed to become a full-fledged member of Al Qaeda, but he continued to refuse such a commitment until around early 1999, after the 1998 U.S. embassy bombings in Nairobi and Dar es Salaam.

In 1997, Mohammed moved his family from Iran to Karachi, Pakistan. That year, he tried unsuccessfully to join mujahideen leader Ibn al-Khattab in Chechnya, another area of special interest to Mohammed. Unable to travel to Chechnya, he returned to Afghanistan. He ultimately accepted bin Laden's invitation to move to Kandahar and join al-Qaeda as a full-fledged member. Eventually, he became leader of Al Qaeda's media committee.

Plan for September 11, 2001 attacks

The first hijack plan that Mohammed presented to the leadership of al-Qaeda called for several airplanes on both east and west coasts to be hijacked and flown into targets. His plan evolved from an earlier foiled plot known as the Bojinka plot (see above). Bin Laden rejected some potential targets suggested by Mohammed, such as the U.S. Bank Tower in Los Angeles, as he wished to simplify the attacks.

In late 1998 or early 1999, bin Laden gave approval for Mohammed to proceed to organize the plot. Meetings in early 1999 took place with Khalid Sheikh Mohammed, Osama bin Laden, and his military chief, Mohammed Atef. Bin Laden led the plot and provided financial support. He was also involved in selecting the participants, including choosing Mohamed Atta as the lead hijacker. Khalid Sheikh provided operational support, such as selecting targets and helping arrange travel for the hijackers. Atef directed the actions of the hijackers.

After Atta was chosen as the leader of the mission, "he met with Bin Laden to discuss the targets: the World Trade Center, which represented the U.S. economy; the Pentagon, a symbol of the U.S. military; and the U.S. Capitol, the perceived source of U.S. policy in support of Israel. The White House was also on the list, as Bin Laden considered it a political symbol and wanted to attack it as well." If any pilot could not reach his intended target, he was to crash the plane.

According to testimony by Philip Zelikow, bin Laden was motivated by a desire to punish the US for supporting Israel and wanted to move up the attack date. Mohammed argued for ensuring the teams were prepared.

[Bin Laden] allegedly told KSM it would be sufficient simply to down the planes and not hit specific targets. KSM stood his ground, arguing that the operation would not be successful unless the pilots were fully trained and the hijacking teams were larger.

In a 2002 interview with Al Jazeera journalist Yosri Fouda, Mohammed admitted that he and Ramzi bin al-Shibh were involved in the "Holy Tuesday operation". ("Holy Tuesday operation" was the terrorists' code name for the 9/11 attacks, and the attacks actually did take place on a Tuesday.) KSM, however, disputes this claim via his Personal Representative: "I never stated to the Al Jazeera reporter that I was the head of the al-Qaeda military committee."

In a April 2002 interview with Al Jazeera correspondent Yosri Fouda, KSM, and Ramzi bin al-Shibh described the preparations for 9/11 attacks and said that they first thought of "striking at a couple of nuclear facilities" in the U.S. but then "it was eventually decided to leave out nuclear targets for now."

Daniel Pearl murder

According to a CNN interview with intelligence expert Rohan Gunaratna, "Daniel Pearl was going in search of the al Qaeda network that was operational in Karachi, and it was at the instruction of Khalid Sheikh Mohammed that Daniel Pearl was killed." On October 12, 2006, Time magazine reported that "KSM confessed under CIA interrogation that he personally committed the murder." On March 15, 2007, the Pentagon stated that Mohammed had confessed to the murder. The statement quoted Mohammed as saying, "I decapitated with my blessed right hand the head of the American Jew, Daniel Pearl, in the city of Karachi, Pakistan. For those who would like to confirm, there are pictures of me on the Internet holding his head." This confession was gained under torture, and Mohammed listed many other crimes at the same time.

According to an investigative report published in January 2011 by Georgetown University, the Federal Bureau of Investigation used vein matching to determine that the perpetrator in the video of the killing of Pearl was most likely Mohammed, notably through identifying a "bulging vein" running across his hand. Concerned that the confession obtained through waterboarding did not hold up in court; federal officials used this forensic evidence to bolster their case.

Capture, interrogation, and torture

On September 11, 2002, members of Pakistani Inter-Services Intelligence (ISI) claimed to have killed or captured Sheikh Mohammed during a raid in Karachi that resulted in bin al-Shibh's capture. This Pakistani claim was false.

Mohammed was captured in Rawalpindi, Pakistan (about 20 km southwest of Islamabad), on March 1, 2003, by the Pakistani ISI, possibly in a joint action with the CIA's Special Activities Division paramilitary operatives and officers of the American Diplomatic Security Service. He has been in U.S. custody since that time.

Initially, Mohammed was held in the CIA's Salt Pit (Cobalt) prison in Afghanistan. After just a "few minutes" of questioning at Cobalt, he was subject to "enhanced interrogation techniques". He was slapped, grabbed in the face, placed in stress positions, placed in standing sleep deprivation, doused with water, and subjected to rectal rehydration multiple times, without a determination of medical need.

During 2003, Mohammad was held at a secret CIA prison, or black site, in Poland, where the CIA waterboarded him 183 times. He was then transferred to another secret CIA prison in Romania.

In September 2006, the U.S. government announced it had moved Mohammed from a secret CIA prison (or black site) to the military custody at the Guantanamo Bay detention camp.

The Red Cross, Human Rights Watch and Mohammed consider that the harsh interrogation techniques, including waterboarding, which he received from U.S. agents amount to torture. Mohammad was also subject to sleep deprivation for a period of  days, during much of which he was forced to stand.

According to later reports, Mohammed initially told American interrogators he would not answer any questions until he was provided with a lawyer, which was refused. He claims to have been kept naked for more than a month during his isolation and interrogations, and said he was "questioned by an unusual number of female handlers".

A CIA document reveals that Jane Harman (D-CA) and Porter Goss (R-FL) of the House Intelligence Committee were briefed on July 13, 2004, by the CIA Deputy Director for Operations James Pavitt, General Counsel Scott Muller, and CIA Inspector General John L. Helgerson on the status of the interrogation process of Mohammed. By this date, Khalid Sheikh Mohammed had been subjected to 183 applications of waterboarding.

The document states:

A U.S. official has clarified that the "183" number represents the number of times water was poured onto Mohammed's face—not the number of times the CIA waterboarded him. According to a 2007 Red Cross report, Khalid Sheikh Mohammed was subjected a total of "five sessions of ill-treatment."

"The water was poured 183 times – there were 183 pours," the official explained, adding that "each pour was a matter of seconds."

On October 12, 2004, Human Rights Watch reported that 11 suspects, including Khalid Sheikh Mohammed, had "disappeared" to a semi-secret prison in Jordan, and may have been tortured there under the direction of the CIA. At the time, Jordanian and American officials denied those allegations.

On February 5, 2008, the CIA Director Michael Hayden told a Senate committee that his agents had used waterboarding on Khalid Sheikh Mohammed. A 2005 U.S. Justice Department memo released in April 2009 stated that Mohammed had undergone waterboarding 183 times in March 2003.

In October 2006, Mohammed described his mistreatment and torture in detention, including the waterboarding, to a representative of the International Committee of the Red Cross. Mohammed said that he had provided a lot of false information, which he had supposed the interrogators wanted to hear, in order to stop the mistreatment. In the 2006 interview with the Red Cross, Mohammed claimed to have been waterboarded in five different sessions during the first month of interrogation in his third place of detention. While the Justice Department memos did not explain exactly what the numbers represented, a U.S. official with knowledge of the interrogation programs explained the 183 figure represented the number of times water was applied to the detainee's face during the waterboarding sessions, rather than separate sessions.

In March 2007, after four years in captivity, including six months of detention and alleged torture at Guantanamo Bay, Khalid Sheikh Mohammed—as it was claimed by a Combatant Status Review Tribunal Hearing in Guantanamo Bay—confessed to masterminding the September 11 attacks, the Richard Reid shoe bombing attempt to blow up an airliner over the Atlantic Ocean, the Bali nightclub bombing in Indonesia, the 1993 World Trade Center bombing and various foiled attacks. "I was responsible for the 9/11 operation from A to Z," Khalid Sheikh Mohammed said in a statement read Saturday during a Combatant Status Review Tribunal at the Guantanamo Bay detention camp.

According to the "unclassified summary of evidence" presented during the CSRT hearing, a computer hard drive seized during the capture of Khalid Sheikh Mohammed contained the following:
 information about the four airplanes hijacked on September 11, 2001, including code names, airline company, flight number, target, pilot name and background information, and names of the hijackers;
 photographs of 19 individuals identified as September 11, 2001, hijackers;
 a document that listed the pilot license fees for Mohammad Atta and biographies for some of September 11, 2001, hijackers;
 images of passports and an image of Mohammad Atta;
 transcripts of chat sessions belonging to at least one of September 11, 2001, hijackers;
 three letters from Osama bin Laden;
 spreadsheets that describe financial assistance to families of known al Qaeda members
 a letter to the United Arab Emirates threatening attack if their government continued to help the United States;
 a document that summarized operational procedures and training requirements of an al Qaeda cell; and
 a list of killed and wounded al Qaeda militants.

At the hearing, Khalid Sheikh Mohammed said the computer belonged not to him, but to Mustafa Ahmad al-Hawsawi, arrested together with him.

In June 2008, a New York Times article, citing unnamed CIA officers, claimed that Mohammed had been held in a black site or secret facility in Poland near Szymany Airport, about 100 miles north of Warsaw. There he was interrogated under waterboarding before he began to "cooperate."

In 2009, Mohammed described his actions and motivations in a document publicly released and known as The Islamic Response to the Government's Nine Accusations.

In April 2011, the British newspaper, The Telegraph said it received leaked documents regarding the Guantanamo Bay interrogations of Khalid Sheikh Mohammed. The documents cited Mohammed as saying that, if Osama bin Laden is captured or killed by the Coalition of the Willing, an al-Qaeda sleeper cell would detonate a "weapon of mass destruction" in a "secret location" in Europe, and promised it would be "a nuclear hellstorm".

Report that interrogators abused his children

Ali Khan, the father of Majid Khan, another one of the 14 "high-value detainees," released an affidavit on April 16, 2006, that reported that interrogators subjected Khalid Sheikh Mohammed's children, aged 6 and 8 years old, to abusive interrogation.

Khan's affidavit quoted another of his sons, Mohammed Khan:

Transfer to Guantánamo and hearing before his Combatant Status Review Tribunal
On September 6, 2006, then-American President George W. Bush confirmed, for the first time, that the CIA had held "high-value detainees" for interrogation in secret prisons around the world. He also announced that fourteen senior captives, including Khalid Sheikh Mohammed, were being transferred from CIA custody, to military custody, at Guantanamo Bay detention camp and that these fourteen captives could now expect to face charges before Guantanamo military commissions.

In a September 29, 2006, speech, Bush stated:

In March 2007, Mohammed testified before a closed-door hearing in Guantánamo Bay. According to transcripts of the hearing released by the Pentagon, he said, "I was responsible for the 9/11 operation, from A to Z." The transcripts also show him confessing to:

 Organizing the 1993 World Trade Center bombing,
 The Bali nightclub bombings,
 Richard Reid's attempted shoe bombing,
 Planning the attacks on Heathrow Airport and Big Ben clock tower in London,
 Daniel Pearl's murder in 2002,
 Planned assassination attempts on Pope John Paul II, Pervez Musharraf and Bill Clinton.

On March 15, 2007, BBC News reported that "Transcripts of his testimony were translated from Arabic and edited by the U.S. Department of Defense to remove sensitive intelligence material before release. It appeared, from a judge's question, that Khalid Sheikh Mohammed had made allegations of torture in US custody." In the Defense Department transcript, Mohammed said his statement was not made under duress but Mohammed and human rights advocates have alleged that he was tortured. CIA officials have previously told ABC News that "Mohammed lasted the longest under waterboarding, two and a half minutes, before beginning to talk." Legal experts say this could taint all his statements. Forensic psychiatrist Michael Welner, M.D., an expert in false confessions, observed from the testimony transcript that his concerns about his family may have been far more influential in soliciting Mohammed's cooperation than any earlier reported mistreatment.

One CIA official cautioned that "many of Mohammed's claims during interrogation were 'white noise' designed to send the U.S. on wild goose chases or to get him through the day's interrogation session." For example, according to Mike Rogers, a former FBI agent and the top Republican on the terrorism panel of the House Intelligence Committee, he admitted responsibility for the Bali nightclub bombing, but his involvement "could have been as small as arranging a safe house for travel. It could have been arranging finance." Mohammed also made the admission that he was "responsible for the 1993 World Trade Center Operation," which killed six and injured more than 1,000 when a bomb was detonated in an underground garage, Mohammed did not plan the attack, but he may have supported it. Michael Welner noted that by offering legitimate information to interrogators, Mohammed had secured the leverage to provide misinformation as well.

In an article discussing the reliability of Khalid's confession and the motive for giving misinformation under torture, Ali Soufan, a former FBI special agent with considerable experience interrogating al-Qaeda operatives, pointed out that:

His words are echoed by the U.S. Army Training Manual's section on interrogation, which suggests that:

As an example of this the article discloses that although the George W. Bush administration made claims that the water-boarding (simulated drowning) of Khalid Sheikh Mohammed produced vital information that allowed them to break up a plot to attack the U.S. Bank Tower (formerly Library Tower and First Interstate Bank World Center) in Los Angeles in 2002, this has been proven to be untrue. In 2002 Sheikh Mohammed was busy evading capture in Pakistan. Likewise the claim by former George W Bush Attorney General Michael Mukasey and former CIA director of the National Clandestine Service, Jose Rodriguez, that the torture of Khalid Mohammed produced the most significant lead in finding Osama bin Laden, has also been shown to be false. According to U.S. Senator John McCain, "The trail to bin Laden did not begin with a disclosure from Khalid Sheikh Mohammed, who was waterboarded 183 times ... not only did the use of 'enhanced interrogation techniques' on Khalid Sheikh Mohammed not provide us with key leads on bin Laden's courier, Abu Ahmed; it actually produced false and misleading information."

List of confessions
Mohammed has made at least 31 confessions:
 The February 1993 bombing of the World Trade Center in New York City
 The September 11 attacks on the World Trade Center, the Pentagon, and the United States Capitol using four hijacked commercial airliners.
 A failed "shoe bomber" operation
 The October 2002 attack in Kuwait
The beheading of Wall Street Journal reporter Daniel Pearl
 The 2002 Bali bombings, Pady's and Sari's club bombings in Bali, Indonesia
 A plan for a "second wave" of attacks on major U.S. landmarks after the 9/11 attacks, including the Library Tower in Los Angeles, the Willis Tower (formerly Sears Tower) in Chicago, the Empire State Building in New York City, and what has been reported as the Plaza Bank Building in Seattle, although there is no Plaza Bank Building; there is a Safeco Plaza and Columbia Center, the city's tallest skyscraper
 Plots to attack oil tankers and U.S. naval ships in the Straits of Hormuz, the Straits of Gibraltar and in Singapore
 A plan to blow up the Panama Canal
 Plans to assassinate Jimmy Carter
 A plot to blow up suspension bridges in New York City
 A plan to destroy the Sears Tower in Chicago with burning fuel trucks
 Plans to destroy London Heathrow Airport, Canary Wharf and Big Ben in London
 A planned attack on many nightclubs in Thailand
 A plot targeting the New York Stock Exchange and other U.S. financial targets
 A plan to destroy buildings in Eilat, Israel
 Plans to destroy U.S. embassies in Indonesia, Australia and Japan in 2002
 Plots to destroy Israeli embassies in India, Azerbaijan, the Philippines and Australia
 Surveying and financing an attack on an Israeli El-Al flight from Bangkok
 Sending several "mujahideen" into Israel to survey "strategic targets" with the intention of attacking them
 The November 2002 suicide bombing of a hotel in Mombasa, Kenya, and failed attempt to shoot down an Israeli passenger jet leaving Mombasa Airport 
 Plans to attack U.S. targets in South Korea
 Providing financial support for a plan to attack U.S., British and Jewish targets in Turkey
 Surveillance of U.S. nuclear power plants in order to attack them
 A plot to attack NATO's headquarters in Europe
 Planning and surveillance in a 1995 plan (the "Bojinka plot") to bomb 12 American passenger jets
 The planned assassination attempt against then-U.S. President Bill Clinton during a mid-1990s trip to the Philippines
 "Shared responsibility" for a plot to kill Pope John Paul II
 Plans to assassinate Pakistani President Pervez Musharraf
 An attempt to attack a U.S. oil company in Sumatra, Indonesia, "owned by the Jewish former [U.S.] Secretary of State Henry Kissinger"

After Mohammed arrived at Guantánamo, a team of FBI and military interrogators tried to elicit from him the same confessions that the CIA had obtained about the 9/11 plot, but by using only legal means of interrogation. By 2008, the Bush Administration believed that this so-called "Clean Team" had compiled sufficient evidence to charge Mohammed and the others with capital murder.

The Department of Defense announced on August 9, 2007, that all fourteen of the "high-value detainees" who had been transferred to Guantanamo from the CIA's black sites, had been officially classified as "enemy combatants". Although judges Peter Brownback and Keith J. Allred had ruled two months earlier that only "illegal enemy combatants" could face military commissions, the Department of Defense waived the qualifier and said that all fourteen men could now face charges before Guantanamo military commissions.

Confession used in Sheikh Omar's defense
On March 19, 2007, Ahmed Omar Saeed Sheikh's lawyers cited Mohammed's confession in defense of their client.

Ahmed Omar Saeed Sheikh, also known as Sheikh Omar, was sentenced to death in a Pakistani court for the murder of Daniel Pearl. Omar's lawyers recently announced that they planned to use Mohammed's confession in an appeal. They had always acknowledged that Omar played a role in Pearl's murder, but argue that Mohammed was the actual murderer.

Prosecution in France
In 2009, the French government decided to try Khalid Sheikh Mohammed in absentia on terrorism charges with respect to the Ghriba synagogue bombing on the Tunisian island of Djerba in 2002, which killed 14 German tourists, five Tunisians and two French nationals. They intended to charge him along with the captured German national Christian Ganczarski and Tunisian Walid Nawar. French judges later decided to separate Khalid Sheikh Mohammed's case from those of Ganczarski and Nawar and try him separately at a later date.

Trial for role in September 11 attacks 

On February 11, 2008, the United States Department of Defense charged Mohammed, Ramzi bin al-Shibh, Mustafa Ahmad al-Hawsawi, Ali Abd al-Aziz Ali and Walid Bin Attash for the September 11, 2001 attacks under the military commission system, as established under the Military Commissions Act of 2006. They have reportedly been charged with the murder of almost 3000 people, terrorism and providing material support for terrorism and plane hijacking; as well as attacking civilian objects, intentionally causing serious bodily injury and destruction of property in violation of the law of war. The charges against them list 169 overt acts allegedly committed by the defendants in furtherance of the September 11 events.

The charges include 2,973 individual counts of murder—one for each person killed in the 9/11 attacks. The prosecution is seeking the death penalty, which would require the unanimous agreement of the commission judges.

Human rights groups, including Amnesty International, Human Rights Watch and the Center for Constitutional Rights, and U.S. military defense lawyers have criticised the military commissions for lacking due process for a fair trial. Critics generally argue for the trials to be held in a federal district court, with defendants treated as criminal suspects, or by court-martial as a prisoner under the Geneva Conventions, which prohibit civilian trials for prisoners of war. Mohammed could face the death penalty under any of these systems.

The case is progressing through the legal system. In August 2019 the trial date was tentatively set for January 11, 2021, by Judge W. Shane Cohen, but this date was postponed on December 18, 2020, due to the COVID-19 pandemic. Mohammed's trial restarted on September 7, 2021.

Legal rulings affecting him 
In Boumediene v. Bush (2008), the United States Supreme Court ruled that detainees had the right of access to US federal courts to petition under habeas corpus to challenge their detentions, and that the Detainee Treatment Act of 2005 and the Military Commissions Act of 2006 were flawed. A revised Military Commissions Act was passed by Congress in 2009 to address court concerns.

Mohammed, in a letter submitted to the court on July 26, 2019, communicated the willingness to help the 9/11 attack victims and their families in their lawsuit against Saudi Arabia. The mastermind is said to have demanded the elimination of his death sentence in the exchange for his cooperation.

Release of new images 
On September 9, 2009, photographs of Khalid Sheikh Mohammed and Ammar al Baluchi were published on the Internet and widely in US and international media. Camp authorities have strict controls over the taking and distribution of images of the Guantanamo captives. Journalists and VIPs visiting Guantanamo are not allowed to take any pictures that show the captives' faces. Journalists may see "high value" captives such as Khalid Sheikh Mohammed only when they are in the court room, where cameras are not allowed. But, on September 9, 2009, independent counter-terrorism researchers found new images of Khalid Sheikh Mohammed and his nephew Ammar al Baluchi on "jihadist websites". According to Carol Rosenberg, writing in The Miami Herald: "The pictures were taken in July, said International Committee of the Red Cross spokesman Bernard Barrett, under an agreement with prison camp staff that lets Red Cross delegates photograph detainees and send photos to family members."

In November 2014, a Turkish manufacturer of over-the-counter hair removal cream was found to be using an image of a disheveled Mohammed in adverts for their product.

Manifesto
In January 2014, a 36-page "nonviolence manifesto" written by KSM was declassified and released by the US government. The title is "Khalid Sheikh Mohammad's Statement to the Crusaders of the Military Commissions in Guantanamo." The document outlines 3 parts, but appears to be just the first section, describing "the path to happiness." The subject writes to his captors and appears interested in converting his wider audience to Islam. The notes contain eight books with three Western authors and penciled initials with the date October 31, 2013.

Khalid Sheikh Mohammad and Sulaiman Abu Ghaith
Khalid Sheikh Mohammad has participated as a witness in the trials of two alleged al-Qaeda members, Zacarias Moussaoui and Salim Hamdan. Los Angeles Times reporter Richard Serrano wrote:

"In 2006, his interrogation summaries were read aloud in the capital murder trial of Zacarias Moussaoui, the so-called 20th hijacker, and Moussaoui was spared the death penalty. Two years later, different Mohammed statements were read in a military commission trial, or tribunal, that led to the release from Guantanamo Bay of Osama bin Laden's chauffeur, Salim Hamdan."

Stanly Cohen, an attorney for Sulaiman Abu Ghaith, requested to interview Mohammad, who they described as "the most qualified person alive" to assist in Abu Gaith's defense. Mohammad, through his attorney David Nevin, agreed to be interviewed, but only "in the absence of government personnel whether physically present or by listening or recording remotely."

Mohammed instead drafted a 14-page statement response to 451 interrogatories submitted by Cohen. In the response, Mohammad called Abu Ghaith, a "pious man" and "spellbinding speaker" who, to the best of his knowledge, did not play any military role in al-Qaeda operations and had no military training. Mohammed argued that Western foreign policy has been hypocritical in that it allowed for the rise of the Mujahideen in the Soviet War, but that Western media has since branded the Mujahideen "terrorists" or "foreign fighters". He further claimed that the Taliban's strict Islamic rule had restored security to Afghanistan in the 1990s. U.S. District Judge Lewis A. Kaplan ruled that neither Mohammad's statement nor testimony were relevant to Abu Ghaith's trial, and thus inadmissible.

Media
The crime documentary series Mugshots released an episode, "KSM's Confessions" which tracks Khalid Sheikh Mohammed from New York to Pakistan.

See also
 Shaker Aamer
 Ramzi bin al-Shibh

Notes

References

External links

Enhanced Interrogation – Inside the Minds and Motives of the Islamic Terrorists Trying to Destroy America
Military Commissions (case documents), Official DOD site
Commissions cases
Commission Review cases
 AP: "Khalid Sheikh Mohammed's own words provide glimpse into the mind of a terrorist", International Herald Tribune, March 16, 2007
 "Substitute for Testimony" from Khalid Sheikh Mohammed, A summary of information KSM provided to his American interrogators (used by defence in the trial of Zacarias Moussaoui).
 The Final 9/11 Commission Report, Chapter 5 concentrates of KSM
 "Khalid Sheikh Mohammed: life of terror", CNN blog, March 2, 2003
 Khalid Sheikh Mohammed, National Review
 "Top al-Qaeda suspect in U.S. hands", BBC
 "Bush Spells Out 'LA Terror Plot'", BBC, February 9, 2006
Pentagon charges 6 in 9-11 attacks
'Clean team' interrogated 9-11 suspects
Profile Key 9-11 suspects
The Mark Steyn Show with James E Mitchell

Interrogations
FBI Most Wanted Terrorists
1960s births
Living people
Pakistani Muslims
Al-Qaeda leaders
North Carolina A&T State University alumni
People associated with the September 11 attacks
Chowan University alumni
Detainees of the Guantanamo Bay detention camp
People subject to extraordinary rendition by the United States
University of the Punjab alumni
Pakistani engineers
Pakistani extrajudicial prisoners of the United States
Islamist mass murderers
Pakistani mass murderers
Pakistani al-Qaeda members
Pakistani exiles